Sheri Hagen (* 1968 in Lagos) is a German actor, writer, director, and film producer based in Berlin, owner of the production company Equity Film GmbH, and promoter and advocate for diversity within German film.

Life 
Sheri Hagen was born in Lagos, grew up in Hamburg, and has lived in Berlin since the mid-1990s. Her first language is German. Originally she wanted to become a doctor, but when she accompanied a friend to an audition for a musical project, both were accepted. Hagen received her acting training at the Theater an der Wien. From 2010 to 2012 she acted at the Berlin Vaganten Bühne and acted in the 2013/14 season at the Ballhaus Naunynstraße.

Hagen mostly works in front of the camera. Since 1995, after her television debut in an episode of the series Praxis Bülowbogen, she has been seen in numerous productions, such as multiple episodes of Tatort, as well as in other series such as Der Landarzt, Siska, and Bella Block. She also acted in films like Baal, based on the play of the same name by Bertolt Brecht, Das Leben der Anderen, and as the US Secretary of State Condoleezza Rice in the ZDF-two-part series Deutschlandspiel.

Alongside her acting work, Hagen created her own projects, working as the writer, director, and producer, such as the 2012 award-winning film Auf den zweiten Blick in which Michael Klammer, Pierre Sanoussi-Bliss, and Ingo Naujoks acted. In this film, which focuses on diversity, Hagen not only fights for racial diversity in film, but also showcases disability within film. In 2018 her film Fenster Blau, an adaptation of the play Muttermale Fenster Blau by Marianna Salzmann was released into theaters. Hagen has her own film production company, Equality Film GmbH, which is based in Berlin. In addition to using her films as works of activism, Hagen also promotes diversity in film and television as an expert in her field.

Filmography (Selected) 

1995: Praxis Bülowbogen – Alles brave Bürger hier
1995: Der Clan der Anna Voss
1996: Tatort: Lockvögel (Television series)
1996: Auf Achse – Nichts als Ärger mit dem Kind
1996: Faust – Auf Sendung
1996: Der Landarzt – Ansteckungsgefahr
1996: The Old Fox – Der Lebensretter
1997: Verdammtes Glück
1997–1998: Leinen los für MS Königstein (3 episodes as Tina)
1998: Single sucht Nachwuchs
1998: Einsatz Hamburg Süd – Schutz
1999: Drei mit Herz
1999: Unter den Palmen
1999: Siska – Der Schlüssel zum Mord
2000: Ben & Maria – Liebe auf den zweiten Blick
2000: Liebesengel
2000: Harte Jungs und weiche Windeln
2000: Deutschlandspiel
2002: Ein Albtraum von 3½ Kilo
2004: Baal
2004: Siska – Morgen bist du tot
2005: Wo bleibst du, Baby?
2005: Ein Koala-Bär allein zu Haus
2005: Tatort: Minenspiel
2005: Tatort: Leiden wie ein Tier
2006: Das Leben der Anderen
2006: Tatort: Tod aus Afrika
2006: Beim nächsten Kind wird alles anders
2007: Sperling und die kalte Angst (Television series)
2007: R. I. S. – Die Sprache der Toten – Traumatisiert
2009: 
2009: Tatort: Das Gespenst
2012: Auf den zweiten Blick (Producer)
2012: Die Männer der Emden
2012: Flemming – Der Sinn des Lebens
2013: Bella Block: Angeklagt
2014: Die Schlikkerfrauen
2015: Der Äthiopier
2016: Der Alte – Paradiesvogel
2017: SOKO Leipzig – Melodie des Todes
2017: Die Luther Matrix
2017: SOKO Stuttgart – Melodie des Todes
2019: Herr und Frau Bulle: Totentanz
2021: Biohackers
2021: Der Zürich-Krimi: Borchert und der Mord im Taxi
2021: Nie zu spät

Personal Projects 
 2007: Stella und die Störche (Short film, credited as writer, director, producer and actor)
 2013: Auf den zweiten Blick (Theatrical release, credited as writer, director and producer)
 2015: Simply Different (Short film, credited as writer, director, producer and actor)
 2017: Fenster Blau (Theatrical release, credited as writer, director and producer)

Awards 
 2012: Schreibtisch am Meer für Auf den zweiten Blick
 2013: Prize winner at the Kirchlichen Filmfestival Recklinghausen for Auf den zweiten Blick

External links 
 
 Sheri Hagen from crew united
 Sheri Hagen from filmportal.de
 Sheri Hagen in the Agentur Osman

References 

1968 births
21st-century German actresses
Living people
21st-century German writers
German film producers
German film directors